Namibia is represented at the 2006 Commonwealth Games in Melbourne by a xx-member strong contingent comprising xx sportspersons and xx officials.

Medals

Gold
 Jafet Uutoni, Boxing, Light Flyweight 48 kg

Silver

Bronze
 Friedhelm Ferdinand Sack, Shooting, Men's 10m Air Pistol

Nations at the 2006 Commonwealth Games
Commonwealth Games
Namibia at the Commonwealth Games